Tatlayoko Lake is an unincorporated settlement and locality on the Homathko River just north of that river's entry into the lake of same name, which is located in the western Chilcotin Country of the Central Interior of British Columbia, Canada.

Climate
The name Tatlayoko is derived from the Tsilhqot'in language and means "lake of the big winds." 
 True to its name, the community is windy throughout the fall and winter as the warm Chinook winds blow up the valley. The Chilcotin Plateau is known for being extremely cold in the winter, but Tatlayoko Lake is an exception thanks to its proximity to the mild Pacific Ocean. While the coastal winds bring the community relatively mild winters, the mountains block most of the coastal precipitation, leaving the community comparatively dry.

In relation to the nearby community of Tatla Lake and indeed the rest of the Chilcotin Plateau off to the east, Tatlayoko Lake tends to be wetter in the winter and drier in the summer. Tatlayoko Lake has a continental climate (Dfb), bordering on a subarctic climate (Dfc).

Weather facts 
 Driest Year (2002) = 
 Wettest Year (1950) = 
 Warmest Year (1941) = 
 Coldest Year (1957) =

References

Populated places in the Chilcotin
Unincorporated settlements in British Columbia